EPG may refer to:

 Eggs per gram, a parasitology test
 Electrical penetration graph
 Electronic program guide
 Electropalatography
 Eminent Persons Group (disambiguation)
 Engin Principal du Génie, an armoured fighting vehicle of France
 EPG model, a strategic business model
 Epigen, a protein